The West Virginia Mountaineers college football team competes as part of the NCAA Division I Football Bowl Subdivision (FBS), representing the West Virginia University in the Big 12 Conference (Big 12). Since the establishment of the team in 1891, West Virginia University has appeared in 39 bowl games. Included in these games are four appearances in the Peach Bowl, three appearances in the Sugar Bowl, two in the Fiesta Bowl and one in the Orange Bowl. Throughout the history of the program, eleven separate coaches have led the Mountaineers to bowl games with Don Nehlen having the most appearances (13). West Virginia's overall bowl record is 16–23.

Key

Bowl games

Notes

References
General

Specific

West Virginia Mountaineers

West Virginia Mountaineers bowl games